A Letter to Myself (給自己的信) is a 2009 album by Cantopop singer Sherman Chung (鍾舒漫)

Track listing
CD
 Higher 
 給自己的信 (Letter to Myself)
 天愛 (Favored by God)
 妹妹 (Younger Sister)
 三者 (The Third Person)
 親手擁抱 (Hug)
 從前流淚光 (Cried Enough)
 媽媽你累嗎 (You Tired, Mum?)
 我有想着你 (I Did Think About You)
 不速之客 (Someone Not Invited)
 專一有罪 (鍾舒漫/鄭家維) (Faithfulness Is a Crime)

DVD
The CD+DVD edition includes a DVD with two MV:
 給自己的信
 專一有罪 (鍾舒漫/鄭家維)

2009 albums
Sherman Chung albums